Arsen Georgievich Avakov (born 28 May 1971) is a former Tajikistani football player. He is of Armenian descent. Arsen won the top scorer award in the Ukrainian Premier League in 1995 while playing for FC Torpedo Zaporizhia, the first foreign player in history of the Ukrainian Premier League to do so.

Avakov began his playing career with FC Pamir Dushanbe in the Soviet Top League, before moving to clubs in Ukraine. He finished his career with FC Torpedo Moscow, FC Shinnik Yaroslavl, FC Lokomotiv Nizhny Novgorod and FC Uralan Elista in the Russian Premier League.

International career stats

Goals for senior national team

References

1971 births
Expatriate footballers in Russia
Expatriate footballers in Ukraine
FC Elista players
FC Lokomotiv Nizhny Novgorod players
CSKA Pamir Dushanbe players
FC Shinnik Yaroslavl players
FC Temp Shepetivka players
FC Torpedo Moscow players
FC Torpedo-2 players
FC Torpedo Zaporizhzhia players
Living people
Sportspeople from Dushanbe
Russian Premier League players
Soviet footballers
Soviet Armenians
Soviet Top League players
Tajikistan international footballers
Tajikistani people of Armenian descent
Tajikistani expatriate footballers
Tajikistani footballers
Ukrainian Premier League players
Ukrainian Premier League top scorers
Tajikistani expatriate sportspeople in Russia
Tajikistani expatriate sportspeople in Ukraine
Association football forwards
Ethnic Armenian sportspeople